The United States government applies sanctions against certain institutions and key members of the Chinese government and its ruling Chinese Communist Party (CCP), certain companies linked to the People's Liberation Army (PLA), and other affiliates that the US government has accused of aiding in human rights abuses. The US maintained embargoes against China from the inception of the People's Republic of China in 1949 until 1972. An embargo was reimposed by the US following the 1989 Tiananmen Square protests and massacre. From 2020 onward, the US imposed sanctions and visa restrictions against several Chinese government officials and companies, in response to allegations of a genocide against the Uyghur population in Xinjiang and human rights abuses in Hong Kong and Tibet.

Sanctions in the early PRC (1949–1979)
After the establishment of Communist rule in China in 1949,  an embargo against the sale of military technology or infrastructure, previously levied against the Soviet Union, was expanded to include the newly established People's Republic of China. Following the onset of the Korean War, further trade restrictions were imposed. According to academic Chun Lin, the embargo resulted in increased Chinese nationalism.

The trade embargo was lifted under President Richard Nixon in 1972 right before the opening of China and establishment of official relations.

Sanctions after the 1989 Tiananmen Square protests and massacre

Following the Tiananmen Square massacre, the Bush Sr. administration imposed an arms embargo against the PRC after the massacre of the protesters.

Ban of Huawei and ZTE equipment

In August 2018, President Trump signed the National Defense Authorization Act for Fiscal Year 2019 (NDAA 2019) banned Huawei and ZTE equipment from being used by the U.S. federal government, citing security concerns.

In addition, on 15 May 2019, the Department of Commerce added Huawei and 70 foreign subsidiaries and "affiliates" to its Entity List under the Export Administration Regulations, citing the company having been indicted for "knowingly and willfully causing the export, re-export, sale and supply, directly and indirectly, of goods, technology and services (banking and other financial services) from the United States to Iran and the government of Iran without obtaining a license from the Department of Treasury's Office of Foreign Assets Control (OFAC)". This restricts U.S. companies from doing business with Huawei without a government license. Various U.S.-based companies immediately froze their business with Huawei to comply with the regulation. That same year, it was determined that Huawei also provided equipment to build North Korea’s 3G network.

Currency manipulator designation
In August 2019, the United States Department of the Treasury designated China a currency manipulator, which resulted in China being excluded from U.S. government procurement contracts. The designation was withdrawn in January 2020 after China agreed to refrain from devaluing its currency to make its own goods cheaper for foreign buyers.

Sanctions under Uyghur Human Rights Policy Act

On July 9, 2020, the Trump administration imposed sanctions and visa restrictions against senior Chinese officials, including CCP Politburo member Chen Quanguo, Zhu Hailun, Wang Mingshan and Huo Liujun. With sanctions, they and their immediate relatives are barred from entering the US and will have US-based assets frozen. In response, the Chinese government announced sanctions against US Senators Ted Cruz, Marco Rubio, and other American officials.

Sanctions under Hong Kong Autonomy Act

In August 2020, Chief Executive Carrie Lam and ten other Hong Kong government officials were sanctioned by the United States Department of the Treasury under an executive order by President Trump for undermining Hong Kong's autonomy. The sanction is based on the Hong Kong Autonomy Act and Lam would be listed in the Specially Designated Nationals and Blocked Persons List.

On December 7, 2020, pursuant to the order, the US Department of the Treasury imposed sanctions on entire 14 Vice Chairpersons of the National People's Congress of China, for "undermining Hong Kong's autonomy and restricting the freedom of expression or assembly".

Prohibition of investment in companies linked to China’s military
On November 12, 2020, President Donald Trump signed Executive Order 13959, titled "Addressing the Threat From Securities Investments That Finance Communist Chinese Military Companies". The executive order prohibits all U.S. investors (institutional and retail investors alike) from purchasing or investing in securities of companies identified by the U.S. Department of Defense as "Communist Chinese military companies." As of January 14, 2021, 44 Chinese companies were identified. Five of these companies are to be delisted by the New York Stock Exchange by March 2021. On January 13, 2021, the executive order was amended to require divestment from the companies by November 11, 2021.

2022 Russian invasion of Ukraine 

In June 2022, the United States Department of Commerce placed five Hong Kong companies on the Bureau of Industry and Security's Entity List for providing support to Russia's military. In September 2022, the Office of Foreign Assets Control sanctioned Sinno Electronics of Shenzhen for supplying a Russian military procurement network.

In January 2023, the U.S. Treasury Department sanctioned Spacety China, also known as Changsha Tianyi Space Science and Technology Research Institute Co. Ltd., for providing satellite imagery to the Wagner Group. In February 2023, the U.S. Commerce Department added AOOK Technology Ltd, Beijing Ti-Tech Science and Technology Development Co, Beijing Yunze Technology Co, and China HEAD Aerospace Technology Co to the Entity List for aiding Russia's military.

In March 2023, the U.S. Treasury Department sanctioned five Chinese companies for supplying equipment to the Iran Aircraft Manufacturing Industries Corporation, which manufactures HESA Shahed 136 drones used by Russia against Ukraine.

Sanctions on Chinese semiconductor industry 
On October 7, 2022, the Bureau of Industry and Security of the United States Department of Commerce implemented controls related to advanced computing and semiconductor manufacturing in China. Some of these controls began immediately whereas others became effective on October 12, 2022, and October 21, 2022.

In March 2023, the U.S. Department of Commerce added 28 additional Chinese firms to the Entity List, including Inspur and Loongson, for acquiring American technology in support of the PLA.

See also
United States foreign policy toward the People's Republic of China
United States sanctions
China–United States relations
Uyghur Forced Labor Prevention Act

References

China
China–United States relations
2020 in international relations
2020 in economics
Geopolitical rivalry
Anti-communism in the United States
China and the 2022 Russian invasion of Ukraine